Marcel Damaschek (born 24 March 1997) is a German footballer who plays as a left back for Alemannia Aachen.

References

External links
 

Living people
1997 births
German footballers
Association football fullbacks
SG Sonnenhof Großaspach players
Wuppertaler SV players
Alemannia Aachen players
1. FC Köln II players
TSV Steinbach Haiger players
Bonner SC players
3. Liga players
Regionalliga players
Footballers from Cologne